Aporocidaris fragilis is a species of sea urchin of the family Ctenocidaridae. It is well-armoured with spines. It is placed in the genus Aporocidaris and lives in the sea. Aporocidaris fragilis was first scientifically described in 1907 by Alexander Emanuel Agassiz & Hubert Lyman Clark.

This species is morphologically very similar to Aporocidaris milleri and Aporocidaris antarctica and they may not be separate species.

See also 
 Aporocidaris antarctica
 Aporocidaris eltaniana
 Aporocidaris incerta

References 

Ctenocidaridae
Animals described in 1907
Taxa named by Hubert Lyman Clark